Yurginsky (masculine), Yurginskaya (feminine), or Yurginskoye (neuter) may refer to:
Yurginsky District, name of several districts in Russia
Yurginsky Urban Okrug, a municipal formation, which the town of Yurga, Kemerovo Oblast, is incorporated as
Yurginsky (inhabited locality) (Yurginskaya, Yurginskoye), name of several rural localities in Russia